BRF1 is the first national radio station for the German community of Belgium, owned by Belgischer Rundfunk.

Location 
BRF has three sites, its headquarters in the town of Eupen and studios in Brussels and Saint Vith.

History 
BRF1 was created in 2001, after it was decided to split the BRF Radio into BRF1 for pop and rock music while BRF2 caters for traditional and folk music, along with the creation of joint venture between BRF and Deutschlandfunk namely BRF-DLF in Brussels.

Reception 
BRF1 can be received via FM radio, DAB radio, Cable and xDSL providers and online

FM reception

DAB reception

DVB-T as an Audio only service

Cable and xDSL Providers

See also 
 List of radio stations in Belgium

References 

Radio stations in Belgium
German-language radio stations
Radio stations established in 1945
News and talk radio stations